Mike O'Rourke (Michael David O'Rourke; born 25 August 1955) is a retired javelin thrower from New Zealand. He represented his country at the 1984 Summer Olympics in Los Angeles, California and at three Commonwealth Games. He was national champion eight times. O'Rourke was born in Croydon, New South Wales, Australia.

Personal bests
Pre-1986 specification:
90.58 m NR
1986 specification:
79.00 m

Achievements

References
 
 
 
 GBRathletics

External links
 

1955 births
Living people
Australian emigrants to New Zealand
New Zealand male javelin throwers
Athletes (track and field) at the 1984 Summer Olympics
Olympic athletes of New Zealand
Commonwealth Games silver medallists for New Zealand
Commonwealth Games gold medallists for New Zealand
Sportsmen from New South Wales
Athletes (track and field) at the 1978 Commonwealth Games
Athletes (track and field) at the 1982 Commonwealth Games
Athletes (track and field) at the 1990 Commonwealth Games
Commonwealth Games medallists in athletics
Medallists at the 1978 Commonwealth Games
Medallists at the 1982 Commonwealth Games